Tom Okker was the defending champion of the singles event at the ABN World Tennis Tournament, but lost in the final to first seeded Arthur Ashe 3–6, 6–2, 6–4.

Seeds

Draw

Finals

Upper half

Lower half

References

External links
 ITF tournament edition details

1975 ABN World Tennis Tournament